Francis Morrone (born 12 May 1958) is an American architectural historian of Irish and Italian ancestry, originally from Chicago, known for his work on the built history of New York City.

Morrone's essays on architecture have appeared in The Wall Street Journal, City Journal, American Arts Quarterly, the New Criterion, Humanities, and The New York Times.  He was a columnist for the New York Sun for six and a half years (2002-2008). In April 2011, Travel + Leisure named him as one of the 13 best tour guides in the world. Morrone was a 2012 recipient of the Arthur Ross Award from the Institute of Classical Architecture and Art, and a 2016 recipient of the Landmarks Lion Award from the Historic Districts Council. He teaches at New York University and is an authority on Edith Wharton. He is married to Patricia Rainsford and lives in Park Slope, Brooklyn.

Books
 Guide to New York City Urban Landscapes
 An Architectural Guidebook to Brooklyn
 The Architectural Guidebook to New York City
 An Architectural Guidebook to Philadelphia
 Brooklyn: A Journey through the City of Dreams
 The Municipal Art Society of New York: 10 Architectural Walks in Manhattan
 New York: Memories of Times Past
 The New York Public Library: The Architecture and Decoration of the Stephen A. Schwarzman Building
 The Park Slope Neighborhood and Architectural History Guide
 The Fort Greene/Clinton Hill Neighborhood and Architectural History Guide
 New York City Landmarks

References

External links
 Francis Morrone website
 
 "The Ghost of Monsieur Stokes"
 "The Museum of Morgan"
"How Henry Hope Reed Saved Architecture"

1958 births
Living people
Writers from Brooklyn
New Classical architecture
American architectural historians
American male non-fiction writers
American columnists
The New York Sun people
The New York Times people
The Wall Street Journal people
Tour guides
People from Park Slope
Historians from New York (state)